The 1996 Baltic Cup football competition took place from 7 to 10 July 1996 at the Kreenholmi Stadium in Narva, Estonia. It was the sixth annual competition of the three Baltic states; Latvia, Lithuania and Estonia; since they regained their independence from the Soviet Union in 1991.

Final table

Results

Estonia vs Latvia

Lithuania vs Latvia

Estonia vs Lithuania

Winners

Statistics

Goalscorers

See also
Balkan Cup
Nordic Football Championship

References

External links
RSSSF
RSSSF Details
omnitel

Baltic Cup (football)
Baltic Cup
Baltic Cup
Baltic Cup
International association football competitions hosted by Estonia